Kings XI Punjab (KXIP) are a franchise cricket team based in Mohali, India, which plays in the Indian Premier League (IPL). They were one of the eight teams which competed in the 2016 Indian Premier League.

Season standings

Match log

References

Punjab Kings seasons
2016 Indian Premier League